Chiasmi International: Trilingual Studies Concerning the Thought of Merleau-Ponty is a peer-reviewed academic journal that publishes articles, reviews, and discussions in Italian, French, and English on the thought of the French philosopher Maurice Merleau-Ponty. The journal is produced in cooperation with the Italian Società di Studi su Maurice Merleau-Ponty, and is distributed by Mimesis Edizioni in Italy
, Librairie philosophique J. Vrin in France, and Pennsylvania State University in the United States. All issues are available online from the Philosophy Documentation Center. The journal is abstracted and indexed in The Philosopher's Index, PhilPapers, and the Philosophy Research Index.

See also 
 List of philosophy journals

References

External links 
 

Annual journals
Multilingual journals
Philosophy journals
Publications established in 1999
Continental philosophy
Philosophy Documentation Center academic journals